Bae Chan-soo (born 14 March 1998) is a South Korean footballer plays as a midfielder and is currently a free agent.

Career statistics

Club

Notes

References

External links
 

1998 births
Living people
South Korean footballers
Association football midfielders
K3 League players
Hong Kong Premier League players
Hoi King SA players